Monticello National Forest was established as the Monticello Forest Reserve by the U.S. Forest Service in Utah on February 6, 1907 with .  It became a National Forest on March 4, 1907. On July 1, 1908 it was combined with La Sal National Forest, which was renamed La Salle National Forest for a short time. The lands presently exist in Manti-La Sal National Forest.

References

External links
Forest History Society
Listing of the National Forests of the United States and Their Dates (from Forest History Society website) Text from Davis, Richard C., ed. Encyclopedia of American Forest and Conservation History. New York: Macmillan Publishing Company for the Forest History Society, 1983. Vol. II, pp. 743-788.

Former National Forests of Utah